"Let It All Bleed Out" is the third and final promotional single from Rob Zombie's third solo album Educated Horses. The song is one of the heavier tracks on the album.

It was used by the game developers to be included in the soundtrack for the video game Scarface: The World is Yours. Portions of the song appeared in the "Best Movie" montage at 2006 MTV Movie Awards where it was used to highlight nominee Sin City.

When performed live by Zombie the song is accompanied by film footage of the Manson Family on the video screens.

Personnel
 Tom Baker - mastering
 Chris Baseford - engineer
 Blasko - bass guitar, background vocals
 Tommy Clufetos - drums, background vocals
 Scott Humphrey - producer
 John 5 - guitar, background vocals
 Will Thompson - assistant engineer
 Rob Zombie - vocals, lyricist, producer, art direction

Chart positions

References

Rob Zombie songs
2006 singles
Songs written by Rob Zombie
Songs written by Scott Humphrey
2006 songs
Geffen Records singles